CGSH may refer to:

 Cheng Kung Senior High School in Taipei
 Cleary Gottlieb Steen & Hamilton, American law firm